Parliamentary elections were held in Benin on 17 February 1991, the first multi-party elections in the country since 1964. The Union for the Triumph of Democratic Renewal alliance emerged as the largest faction, with 12 of the 64 seats in the National Assembly. Voter turnout was 51.7%.

Results

References

Elections in Benin
1991 in Benin
Benin
National Assembly (Benin)